Yvonne Nelson (born November 12, 1985) is a Ghanaian actress, model, film producer and entrepreneur. She has starred in several movies, including House of Gold (2013), Any Other Monday, In April, and Swings.

Early life 
Yvonne Nelson was born in Accra, Ghana. She is of Fante and Ga descent. She started her education at St. Martin De Porres School in Accra and later went to Aggrey Memorial Senior High School. She had her tertiary education at Zenith University College and Central University, where she did a degree course in human resource management. She graduated from the Ghana Institute of Management and Public Administration (GIMPA) with a master's degree in International Relations and Diplomacy in 2020.

Career
Nelson, a former Miss Ghana contestant, accidentally began her career when she went to her favorite place to watch an audition and the producer asked if she would like to perform. He later acquired her number after she rejected the offer. She featured in her first movie scene with big-screen roles in Princess Tyra in 2007 and Playboy in 2008. She delved into movie production in 2011. Her first production was the movie The Price, which was released that same year. She also produced Single and Married in 2012 and House of Gold in 2013. The latter won Best Picture at the Ghana Movie Awards and Best Ghanaian Movie at the 2013 City People Entertainment Awards.

Personal life 
On October 29, 2017, Nelson gave birth to a daughter with her ex-boyfriend, Jamie Roberts. The actress remained silent about rumors of her pregnancy until she announced the birth of her daughter through a WOW Magazine Cover.

Philanthropy
Nelson founded the Yvonne Nelson Glaucoma Foundation in 2010 to help create awareness about the disease. With support from other Ghanaian celebrities, she recorded an all-star charity single and shot a video to help educate people. She also shot a video to help educate people about glaucoma. As a result of her philanthropic activities particularly in glaucoma, she was honored by GoWoman Magazine and Printex for her foundation and film career.

Campaign 
On May 17, 2015, Nelson took it upon herself, together with other celebrities, to add more voices to the masses in protests against the energy crisis in her country. She led a peaceful vigil called DumsorMustStop on May 16, 2015. The hashtag #dumsormuststop is currently used on social media to amplify the concerns of Ghanaians with regards to the energy crisis. Yvonne, known to be very vocal lately about political issues in the country lamented the lack of development in Ghana since the country attained her independence in 1957. She told the BBC in an interview that she may consider running for political office in the future. Actress Yvonne Nelson tweeted that she is looking forward to the day Ghanaians would refuse to vote in presidential elections to send a message to politicians.

Recognition 
Yvonne Nelson was awarded a special award at the "MTN Heroes of Change" in recognition of her charity work in fighting glaucoma.

Filmography 
Nelson has featured in over 100 movies, including:

 4Play Reloaded
 Any Other Monday
 The Black Taliban
 Blood is Thick
 Classic Love
 Crime Suspect
 Crime to Christ
 Deadly Passion
 Deadly Plot
 Desperate to Live
 Diary of a Player
 Doctor May
 Fantasia
 Festival of Love
 Folly
 Forbidden Fruit
 The Game
 Girls Connection
 Gold Diggin
 Golden Adventure
 Heart of Men
 House of Gold (2013)
 If Tomorrow Never Comes
 In April
 Keep My Love
 Local Sense
 Losing You
 Love and Crises
 Love War
 Material Girl
 The Mistresses
 My Cash Adventure
 My Loving Heart
 Obsession
 One Night In Vegas
 Passion of the Soul
 Plan B
 The Playboy
 Pool Party
 The Price
 The Prince's Bride
 Princess Tyra
 The Queen's Pride
 The Return of Beyonce
 Refugees
 Save The Last Kiss
 Save My Love
 Single and Married (2012)
 Single, Married and Complicated
 Strength of a Man
 Swings
 Tears of Womanhood
 Threesome
 To Love and Cherish
 Trapped in the Game
 Who Am I
 Yvonne's Tears
 Sin City 
 Fix Us

Awards and nominations

References

External links 

 

1985 births
Living people
Ghanaian film actresses
Ghanaian film producers
Ghanaian women film producers
Fante people
People from Accra
Central University (Ghana) alumni